Mariana Garcés Córdoba is the 9th Minister of Culture of Colombia. A native of Santiago de Cali, she has been tied to the region and its culture, including working as General Manager of Telepacífico, Member of the National Television Commission, Director of the Association for the Promotion of the Arts, (Proartes) in Cali, Secretary of Culture and Tourism of Cali, Executive Director of the Philharmonic Orchestra of Valle del Cauca, and at different times, Director of the International Art Festival of Cali.

References

External links
 

Year of birth missing (living people)
Living people
People from Cali
Colombian Ministers of Culture
20th-century Colombian lawyers
Colombian women lawyers
Women government ministers of Colombia
21st-century Colombian women politicians
21st-century Colombian politicians
University of Los Andes (Colombia) alumni